Zachariah Poulson (17611844) was an American editor and publisher.

Poulson was born in Philadelphia in 1761. In 1800, he purchased Claypoole's American Daily Advertiser, the successor to America's first daily newspaper, the Pennsylvania Packet. He was state printer for some years, and the publisher of Poulson's Town and Country Almanac, 1789-1801. He also published Proud's History of Pennsylvania, 1797-98. He was a member of several literary and charitable associations, and connected with the Library Company of Philadelphia for 58 years.

Printed works
Ninian Magruder. An inaugural dissertation on the small-pox (1792)
Samuel Cooper. A dissertation on the properties and effects of the datura stramonium, or common thorn-apple (1797)

References

This article incorporates text from the International Cyclopedia of 1890, a publication now in the public domain.

External links
 
 

1761 births
1844 deaths
19th-century American newspaper publishers (people)
Writers from Philadelphia
People of colonial Pennsylvania
Journalists from Pennsylvania